The Samara Centre for Democracy (formerly Samara Canada) is a nonprofit, non-partisan advocacy group for citizen engagement and participation. Samara carries out independent research on the state of Canada's democratic institutions and attitudes Canadians hold about public life. Its efforts to date have focused on the federal level, though the organization's findings have application to provincial and local politics in Canada. Samara's aim is to provide resources to citizens in better understanding their political structures.

The Samara Centre's efforts fall into three categories: research, education, and programming. Samara's reports are based on independent research conducted by the organization to expose aspects of Canadian public life to scrutiny. The first report in the series was the MP Exit Interviews which surveyed former Members of Parliament on how they entered politics and viewed their role. Since that time, reports have been released on other topics such as those disengaged from the political process, populism, civic literacy, and the role of political parties. Their Education arm provides resources to middle and secondary school teachers, as well as professors and post-secondary students on how to more effectively teach people about Canada's democracy and engage citizens. The Samara Centre has launched a programming arm to help bring democracy directly to citizens.

Origin of name and mandate
The organization is named after a samara, "the winged helicopter seed that falls from the maple tree." They note that as the seed of the tree whose leaves are the symbol of Canada, the samara "is a symbol of Canada, and a reminder that from small seeds, big ideas can grow."

Samara Democracy Reports and research
To date, the Samara Centre has released numerous reports, including:

The Real Outsiders: Politically Disengaged Views on Politics and Democracy
The Neighbourhoods of #cdnpoli
Occupiers and Legislators: A Snapshot of Political Media Coverage
Who's the Boss?: Canadians' Views on their Democracy
Lost in Translation or Just Lost?: Canadians' Priorities and the House of Commons
50 Ways to Redesign Parliament
The Real Outsiders
By Invitation Only
Don't Blame "The People": The rise of elite-led populism in Canada

They have also conducted and released annual polls around democratic engagement and the political system in Canada starting in 2012.

Impact

The Samara Centre's research, reports and events have had a profound effect on the political landscape of Canada. The 2012 report, Who's the Boss?: Canadians' Views on their Democracy received wide media coverage across the country for its revelations that of growing dissatisfaction with the House of Commons and MPs. Their fifth report, Lost in Translation or Just Lost?: Canadians' Priorities and the House of Commons has been followed by a major series of pieces in The Globe and Mail newspaper called "Reinventing Parliament" 

Following the release of the MP Exit Interviews reforms were made to the MP orientation to take into account some of the shortcomings identified in the report which was implemented following the 2011 Canadian federal election.

Tragedy in the Commons

In early 2014, the Samara Centre co-founders Alison Loat and Michael MacMillan published their MP exit interviews in a book titled Tragedy in the Commons: Former Members of Parliament Speak out About Canada's Failing Democracy (Toronto: Random House Canada, 2014).  In the book, Loat and MacMillan argue that the Canadian House of Commons is in a crisis period requiring fundamental changes to the way the political institutions and parties operate.

References

External links 
 

Political advocacy groups in Canada
Election and voting-related organizations
Organizations based in Toronto